The knowledge divide is the gap between those who can find, create, manage, process, and disseminate information or knowledge, and those who are impaired in this process. According to a 2005 UNESCO World Report, the rise in the 21st century of a global information society has resulted in the emergence of knowledge as a valuable resource, increasingly determining who has access to power and profit. The rapid dissemination of information on a potentially global scale as a result of new information media and the globally uneven ability to assimilate knowledge and information has resulted in potentially expanding gaps in knowledge between individuals and nations. The digital divide is an extension of the knowledge divide, dividing people who have access to the internet and those who do not. The knowledge divide also represents the inequalities of knowledge among different identities, including but not limited to race, economic status, and gender.

Overview

In the 21st century, the emergence of the knowledge society becomes pervasive. The transformations of world's economy and of each society have a fast pace. Together with information and communication technologies (ICT), these new paradigms have the power to reshape the global economy. In order to keep pace with innovations, to come up with new ideas, people need to produce and manage knowledge. This is why knowledge has become essential for all societies. While knowledge has become essential for all societies due to the growth of new technologies, the increase of mass media information continues to facilitate the knowledge divide between those with educational differences.

Between nations

According to UNESCO and the World Bank, knowledge gaps between nations may occur due to the varying degrees by which individual nations incorporate the following elements:

 Human rights and fundamental freedoms: An absence of freedom within a society can diminish or delay the ability of its members to acquire, debate, and transmit knowledge.  Vital to the spread of knowledge and information between nations are such freedoms as freedom of expression, an absence of censorship, free circulation of information, and freedom of the press.
 Democracy
 Plurality of knowledge and information: This includes a diverse media and the acceptance of diverse forms of knowledge.
 Quality infrastructure: For instance, a poor electrical grid makes the existence of computer networks or of higher education institutions less attainable.
 Effective communication system: This will affect the dissemination of knowledge or movement of ideas within and between nations.
 Effective education system: Gaps in knowledge between nations can exist when individual countries invest too little in primary school education, which acts as the base for the entire education system.  According to UNESCO, in order for a nation to become a knowledge society, primary education must focus on basic literacy and must be universally accessible.  However, as others have pointed out, higher education may be equally important for closing knowledge gaps between nations, particularly between newly industrialized nations, such as the Republic of Korea, and more advanced industrial societies.  For the former, higher education can play an important role in bridging knowledge gaps, but must benefit more than a small elite portion of the population and must be taught at international standards. The poor development of educational institutions from a society affects the creativity of people belonging to that society.
 Focus on Research and Innovation: As the World Bank suggests, Research & Development within a nation can enable it to follow current developments in global knowledge and also to understand how to adapt external knowledge and technology to meet its needs.  In nations with low degrees of R&D, government funding can provide a significant portion of support that can later be taken over by private investment.  Closely tied to effective education systems is the need for a nation to allow for academic freedom.  Because higher educational institutions are significant contributors to R&D, these institutions must be granted freedom to create and disseminate knowledge.  An environment supportive of research and innovation may also help stem the "brain drain" of educated individuals from knowledge-poor nations to knowledge-rich nations.
 Intellectual Property Rights: Closely connected to a focus on research and innovation are national and international Intellectual Property Rights. Within a nation, Intellectual Property Rights can spawn research and innovation by providing economic incentives for investing in new knowledge development.  However, as stated by the World Bank, by protecting innovations, intellectual property rights may also inhibit knowledge-sharing and may prevent developing nations from benefitting from knowledge produced in other countries.

The knowledge divide in gender, race, ethnicity and socioeconomic status

First, it was noticed that a great difference exists between the North and the South  (rich countries vs. poor countries). The development of knowledge depends on spreading Internet and computer technology and also on the development of education in these countries. If a country has attained a higher literacy level then this will result in a higher level of knowledge.
Indeed, UNESCO's report details many social issues in knowledge divide related to globalization. There was noticed a knowledge divide with respect to
 Gender: Socio-cultural inequalities between men and women, such as unequal access to education and technology, create the conditions for unequal access to knowledge.  This can cause significant knowledge gaps both within and between nations, the latter resulting from individual nations' underutilization of their full knowledge workforce. A gap in the use of the internet has been discovered as well. Women are more likely to use the internet for communication, while men are more likely to use it for commerce, information, and entertainment.
Race: Studies have shown that although gaps in access to IT has diminished over the decades, there is still a large gap in IT use between African Americans and other racial groups. These studies have shown that there is a difference in the ways African American use the internet in comparison with other American racial groups.
Socioeconomic: Based on the 2008-2009 American National Election Studies panel data, research has found that socioeconomic status is most closely related to informational use of the internet than access to the internet, and the differential use of the internet between socioeconomic groups is associated with a larger knowledge gap.

Closing the knowledge divide 
Scholars have made similar possibilities in closing or minimizing the knowledge divide between individuals, communities, and nations. Providing access to computers and other technologies that disseminate knowledge is not enough to bridge the digital divide, rather importance must be out on developing digital literacy to bridge the gap. Addressing the digital divide will not be enough to close the knowledge divide, disseminating relevant knowledge also depends on training and cognitive skills.

See also 
 Digital citizen
 Digital divide
 Knowledge gap hypothesis

Notes

References
Hakkarainen, K., & Palonen, T. (2003). Patterns of female and male students' participation in peer interaction in computer-supported learning. Computers & Education, 40, 327–342.()
Scardamalia, M. (2003). Crossing the digital divide: Literacy as by-product of knowledge building. Journal of Distance Education, 17 (Suppl. 3, Learning Technology Innovation in Canada), 78–81.
Scardamalia, M., & Bereiter, C. (2003). Knowledge building environments: Extending the limits of the possible in education and knowledge work. In A. DiStefano, K. E. Rudestam, & R. Silverman (Eds.), Encyclopedia of distributed learning (pp. 269–272). Thousand Oaks, CA: Sage Publications.

Education reform
Alternative education
Educational psychology
Digital divide
Knowledge